Lypova Dolyna is an urban-type settlement in Romny Raion of Sumy Oblast in eastern Ukraine. Population:

History
The date of establishment of the town Lypova Dolyna is not known, but it was first mentioned sometime in 17th century as a village of Magnate Jeremi Wiśniowiecki in Kiev Voivodeship. Its name Lypova Dolyna (Linden Valley) has derived from local river Lypivka.

In 1647 the village contained 150 dwelling yards (households). The population of the village actively participated in the Khmelnytsky Uprising after which it became part of Myrhorod Regiment (one of administrative divisions of Cossack Hetmanate).

In 1658 Lypova Dolyna was raided by Tatars. Later it was a private estate of various Cossack officers (starshina). In 1764 the Russian Empress Catherine the Great gave away Lypova Dolyna to Kirill Razumovski who surrendered his Hetmanate authority the same year. In 1785 the village was sold to the Russian Treasury.

During World War II it was under German occupation.

Urban-type settlement since 1961.

In January 1989 the population was 5303 people. 

In January 2013 the population was 5324 people.

References

Urban-type settlements in Romny Raion
Kiev Voivodeship
Cossack Hetmanate
Gadyachsky Uyezd